Micranthocereus polyanthus is a species of cactus. It is endemic to Brazil, where it is known only from three sites in Bahia. The total population is under 2500 individuals.

References

Endemic flora of Brazil
polyanthus
Endangered plants
Taxonomy articles created by Polbot